SCM Universitatea Craiova is a Romanian professional basketball club based in Craiova. The club competes in Liga Națională, the top tier of Romanian basketball.

History

Over the last few years, the team has also been named CS Universitatea Craiova and CSU Craiova. SCM CSU Craiova reemerged last year on the big stage of Romanian basketball, after many years in the second division, and after withdrawing from the championship altogether, between 2004 and 2007.

In the 2012-2013 season, SCM U Craiova finished on the 4th place (21 wins - 9 losses) at the end of the season and qualified for the Play-Offs. In the first round they played against CS Gaz Metan Medias and lost with 3-0. For the 2013-2014 season, the team announced that they will play in the Balkan International Basketball League.

Current roster

External links
 Official website
  Eurobasket.com SCM U Craiova Page
 Team profile on baschetromania.ro 

2007 establishments in Romania
Organizations based in Craiova
Sport in Craiova
Basketball teams in Romania
Basketball teams established in 2007